Dizajrud-e Sharqi Rural District is in Qaleh Chay District of Ajab Shir County, East Azerbaijan province, Iran. At the census of 2006, its population was 8,914 in 1,993 households; there were 7,589 inhabitants in 2,155 households at the following census of 2011; and in the most recent census of 2016, the population of the rural district was 6,839 in 2,127 households. The largest of its 14 villages was Chenar, with 1,277 people.

References 

Ajab Shir County

Rural Districts of East Azerbaijan Province

Populated places in East Azerbaijan Province

Populated places in Ajab Shir County